Polytribax is a genus of ichneumon wasps in the family Ichneumonidae. There are about 15 described species in Polytribax.

Species
These 15 species belong to the genus Polytribax:

 Polytribax arrogans (Gravenhorst, 1829) c g
 Polytribax castanis (Kim, 1955) c g
 Polytribax contiguus (Cresson, 1864) c g b
 Polytribax crotchii (Cresson, 1879) c
 Polytribax fulvescens (Cresson, 1879) c
 Polytribax fusiformis (Uchida, 1942) c g
 Polytribax luteus (Cameron, 1903) c g
 Polytribax pallescens (Viereck, 1911) c g b
 Polytribax pelinocheirus (Gravenhorst, 1829) c g
 Polytribax penetrator (Smith, 1874) c g
 Polytribax perspicillator (Gravenhorst, 1807) c g
 Polytribax picticornis (Ruthe, 1859) c g
 Polytribax rufipes (Gravenhorst, 1829) c g
 Polytribax senex (Kriechbaumer, 1893) c g
 Polytribax xanthopterus (Szepligeti, 1910) c g

Data sources: i = ITIS, c = Catalogue of Life, g = GBIF, b = Bugguide.net

References

Further reading

External links

 

Parasitic wasps